Aedes (Stegomyia) krombeini is a species complex of zoophilic mosquito belonging to the Scutellaria group of the genus Aedes. It is endemic to Sri Lanka.

Etymology
The specific name is named for Dr. Karl V. Krombein, who was a Senior Entomologist and Principal Investigator of the "Biosystematic Studies of the Insects of Ceylon" project, Smithsonian Institution.

Description
Male has dark scaled proboscis. Scutum with narrow dark scales and a prominent median longitudinal stripe of similar white ones. Mesepimeral scale patches connected forming a V-shaped white scale patch. Coxae with patches of white scales. Halters are with dark scales.

References

External links
[A New Species of Aedes (Stegomyia) from Sri Lanka (Ceylon) (Diptera: Culicidae)]
Susceptibility of Aedes krombeini cell line to some arboviruses.
New embryonic cell line from Aedes krombeini (H.) (Diptera:Culicidae)
Development, longevity, gonotrophic cycle and oviposition of Aedes albopictus Skuse (Diptera: Culicidae) under cyclic temperatures
A note on the occurrence of the Aedes (Stegomia) krombeini (Diptera:Culicidae) in Assam, India
Effect of fluctuating and constant temperatures on development, adult longevity and fecundity in the mosquito Aedes krombeini
Detection by electron microscopy of endogenous viruses in Aedes krombeini (H.) cell line.
Psi-Mutation Affects Phase Angle Difference, Free-Running Period and Phase Shifts in Aedes krombeini (Stegomyia)

krombeini